USS LST-972 was an  in the United States Navy. Like many of her class, she was not named and is properly referred to by her hull designation.

Construction
LST-972 was laid down on 21 November 1944, at Hingham, Massachusetts, by the Bethlehem-Hingham Shipyard; launched on 22 December 1944; sponsored by Mrs. Margaret Avery; and commissioned on 22 January 1945.

Service history
During World War II, LST-972 was assigned to the Asiatic-Pacific theater and participated the assault and occupation of Okinawa Gunto in May and June 1945.

Following World War II, LST-972 performed occupation duty in the Far East until early February 1946. She was decommissioned on 25 June 1946, and struck from the Navy list on 15 August, that same year. On 29 May 1947, the ship was transferred to the Maritime Administration (MARAD) for disposal. On 29 May 1949, she was sold by MARAD to the Texas Petro Company and renamed Tucupita.

Notes

Citations

Bibliography 

Online resources

External links
 

 

LST-542-class tank landing ships
World War II amphibious warfare vessels of the United States
Ships built in Hingham, Massachusetts
1944 ships